The House of Dadiani, later known as the House of Dadiani-Chikovani, was a Georgian family of nobles, dukes and princes, and a ruling dynasty of the western Georgian province of Mingrelia.

The House of Dadiani 

The first data about the family dates back to 1046 AD. Presumably, the Dadiani descended from a certain Dadi, of the House of Vardanisdze. Appointed as hereditary eristavi (dukes) of Odishi (Samegrelo) in reward for their military services, the family had become the most powerful feudal house in western Georgia by the 1280's. At that time, the branches of the family governed also Svaneti, Guria, and Bedia.

In 1542 AD, Duke Levan I Dadiani became hereditary Prince (mtavari) of Mingrelia and established himself as an independent ruler. His descendant Prince Levan III Dadiani was forced to abdicate in 1691 AD and Dadiani’s relatives from the House of Chikovani, hitherto Princes of Salipartiano, inherited the title of Princes of Mingrelia and the surname of Dadiani. The original dynasty of Dadiani thus went extinct into what genealogists have termed the House of Dadiani-Chikovani. Accepting Russian sovereignty in 1802, the Dadiani were elevated to the dignity of Prince of the Russian Empire and enjoyed significant independence in their home affairs. Russia made a de facto annexation of Samegrelo in 1857, but Samegrelo remained nominally in existence until January 4, 1867, when Niko Dadiani, the last Prince of Samegrelo, was deposed and the principality was abolished. Prince Niko Dadiani officially renounced his rights to the throne in 1868.

Dukes (eristavi) and Princes (mtavari) of Mingrelia 

 Vardan I Dadiani (c. 1180s – 1190s)
 Shergil Dadiani (c. 1220s – 1240s)
 Vardan II Dadiani (c. 1240s – 1250s)
 Tsotne Dadiani (c. 1260s)
 Bedan Dadiani (c. 1270s – c. 1290s)
 Giorgi I Dadiani (c. 1293 – 1323)
 Mamia I Dadiani (1323–1345)
 Giorgi II Dadiani (1345–1384)
 Vameq I Dadiani (1384–1396)
 Mamia II Dadiani (1396–1414)
 Liparit I Dadiani (1414–1470)
 Shamadavle Dadiani (1470–1473)
 Vameq II Dadiani (1474–1482)
 Liparit II Dadiani (1482–1512)
 Mamia III Dadiani (1512–1533)
 Levan I Dadiani (1533–1546)
 Giorgi III Dadiani (1546–1573, 1574–1582)
 Mamia IV Dadiani (1574, 1582–1590)
 Manuchar I Dadiani (1590–1611)
 Levan II Dadiani (1611–1657)
 Liparit III Dadiani (1657–1658)
 Vameq III Dadiani (1658–1661)
 Levan III Dadiani (1661–1681)
 Levan IV Dadiani (1681–1691)
 Giorgi IV Dadiani (Lipartiani) (1700–1704, 1710–1714)
 Katsia I Dadiani (1704–1710)
 Bezhan I Dadiani (1714–1728)
 Otia I Dadiani (1728–1758)
 Katsia II Dadiani (1758–1788)
 Grigol I Dadiani (1788–1791, 1794–1802, 1802–1804)
 Manuchar II Dadiani (1791–1793)
 Tariel Dadiani (1793–1794, 1802)
 Levan V Dadiani (1804–1840)
 David I Dadiani (1840–1853)
 Niko I Dadiani (1853–1857)

Heads of the Princely House of Mingrelia 
 Niko I Dadiani (1857–1903)
 Niko II Dadiani (1903–1919)
 Shalva Dadiani (1919–1959)
 Archil Dadiani (1959–1976)
 Niko III Dadiani (1976–present)

Other members of the family 
 Mariam Dadiani, a 17th-century princess
 Constantine Dadiani, a 19th-century poet and general of Russian army
 Andria Dadiani (1850-1910), chess player and tournament patron
 Ekaterine Dadiani (1816-1882), Regent Princess of Mingrelia
 Salome Dadiani (1848-1913), wife of Prince Achille Murat
 Shalva Dadiani (1874-1959), prominent writer and dramatist
 Eleesa Dadiani (born 1988), art gallery owner
 Alex Greenwich (born 1980), Australian politician

References

External links
Dadiani Dynasty. A project by Smithsonian & National Parliamentary Library of Georgia

 
Georgian-language surnames